Haakonsson is a surname. Notable people with the surname include:

Haakon Haakonsson the Young (1232–1257), son of king Haakon Haakonsson of Norway
Harald Haakonsson, joint Earl of Orkney 1122–1127
Knut Haakonsson (1208–1261), claimant to the Norwegian throne, and later jarl
Paul Haakonsson, joint Earl of Orkney 1122–1137
Sigurd Haakonsson (c. 895–962), earl of Lade (Trøndelag) and son of Håkon Grjotgardsson
Sweyn Haakonsson (died c. 1016), Norwegian earl